Torit Airport is an airport serving the town of Torit, in South Sudan.

Location
Torit Airport  is located in Torit County, Imatong State, in the town of Torit, near the International border with the Republic of Uganda. The airport is located to the northeast of the central business district of the town.

The geographic coordinates of Torit Airport are: 4° 24' 40.00"N, 32° 34' 44.00"E (Latitude: 4.411110; Longitude: 32.578890). The airport has a single unpaved runway, the dimensions of which are not publicly known at this time.

Overview
Torit Airport is a small civilian airport that serves the town of Torit and surrounding communities. There are no known scheduled airlines serving this airport at this time.

See also
 Torit
 Eastern Equatoria
 Equatoria
 List of airports in South Sudan

References

External links
 Location of Torit Airport At Google Maps

 

Airports in South Sudan
Equatoria
Eastern Equatoria